The 1974–75 season was the 66th year of football played by Dundee United, and covers the period from 1 July 1974 to 30 June 1975. United finished in fourth place in the First Division.

Match results
Dundee United played a total of 47 competitive matches during the 1974–75 season.

Legend

All results are written with Dundee United's score first.
Own goals in italics

First Division

Scottish Cup

League Cup

European Cup-Winners Cup

References

See also
 1974–75 in Scottish football

Dundee United F.C. seasons
Dundee United